Indian Army Corps of Signals is a corps and a combat support arm of the Indian Army, which handles its military communications. It was formed on 15 February 1911 as a separate entity under Lieutenant Colonel S H Powell, and went on to make important contributions to World War I and World War II. The corps celebrated its 100-year anniversary of its raising on 15 February 2010.

History
After a notification was issued as a Special Army Order dated February 3, 1911, for the organisation of two signal companies, the corps of signals was formed on February 15, 1911, when the 31st and 32nd Divisional Signal Companies, the first Signals units, were raised at Fatehgarh in present-day Uttar Pradesh. Lieutenant Colonel SH Powell, Royal Engineers, was the founder and first head of the Indian Signal Service, which later became the Indian Signal Corps. Until then, the Sappers which were part of the Indian Army Corps of Engineers that was established in 1777, were in charge of passing battlefield messages. Subsequently, the 33rd and 34th Divisional Signal Companies were raised at Ahmednagar, along with the nucleus of the 41st Wireless Squadron at Roorkee on March 1, 1911.

After India gained its independence in 1947, Brigadier CHI Acehurst became the first head of the Corps of Signals, after the 1965 and 1971 wars, the corps underwent important expansions. The corps formally received its regimental colours on 20 February 1965 and on 15 February 1981.

In the mid-1980s, a dedicated organisation to test communication systems was formed, which is now known as the Army Centre for Electromagnetics (ACE). The Indian Army became the first agency to use digital technology for both switching and transmission.

Training and technology

The Corps works closely with the Defence Research and Development Organisation (DRDO) to develop command and control software, notably the Samyukta Electronic Warfare System, a mobile integrated electronic warfare system, developed along with  Bharat Electronics Limited.

The Military College of Telecommunication Engineering (MCTE), Mhow is a premiere training institute of the Corps of Signals. Its war museum is situated at Jabalpur, where 1 Signals Training Centre is based.

References

External links 
 Stamp issued by India Post
 Corps of Signals at Indian Army website
 Corps of Signals at Bharat Rakshak website
 Corps of Signals at Global Security website

S
Military communications corps
Military communications of India
Military units and formations established in 1911